Salumeria Rosi is an Italian restaurant located at 283 Amsterdam Avenue (near West 73nd Street), on the Upper West Side in Manhattan, in New York City. It offers imported meats and cheeses, handcrafted pastas, classic Italian wine and cocktails.

Time Out New York gave the restaurant three stars and The New York Times included it to NYT Critic's Pick.

See also
 List of Italian restaurants

References

External links
 

Restaurants in Manhattan
Restaurants established in 2008
Upper West Side
Italian restaurants in New York City
Italian-American culture in New York City